This is a list of railway museums in Austria.

List

External links
 Links to numerous Austrian museum and heritage railways

Museums
Railway
 
Austria